The discography of British R&B singer Mark Morrison includes two studio albums, two EPs and 20 singles.

Albums

Extended plays

Singles

As lead artist

As featured artist

Guest appearances

Notes

References

Discographies of British artists
Rhythm and blues discographies